Orietta Berti  (born Orietta Galimberti on 1 June 1943) is an Italian pop-folk singer and television personality.

Biography

Born in Cavriago, Berti began her career in 1962 and had her first success in 1965 with the song "Tu sei quello" (You're the one), which won the music contest Un disco per l'estate and ranked second in the Italian hit parade. Several songs of hers, such as "Fin che la barca va" (As long as the boat goes), were not only commercial hits but also became instant classics in Italy. She entered the Sanremo Music Festival competition 11 times between 1966 and 1992, and returned a 12th time in 2021, after a 29-year break, the longest between two participations of the same artist in the history of the contest. In 2021 Fedez, Achille Lauro and Orietta Berti published summer hit "Mille"'. With it, Orietta Berti came again at the first position of Top Chart Singles FIMI 56 years after "Tu sei quello".

Discography

Studio albums
Orietta Berti canta suor Sorriso (1965)
Quando la prima stella (1966)
Orietta Berti (1967)
Dolcemente (1968)
Tipitipitì (1970)
Orietta (1971)
Più italiane di me (1972)
Cantatele con me (1973)
Così come le canto (1974)
Eppure... ti Amo (1975)
Zingari... (1976)
Barbapapà (1979)
Pastelli (1979)
Le mie nuove canzoni (1984)
Futuro (1986)
Io come donna (1989)
Da un'eternità (1992)
Per questo grande ed infinito amore (1996)
Incompatibili ma divisibili (1999)
Il meglio di Orietta vol. 1 (2000)
Il meglio di Orietta vol. 2 (2000)
Dominique (2002)
Emozione d'autore (2003)
Exitos latinos (2006)
Swing – Un omaggio alla mia maniera (2008)
Nonostante tutto... 45 anni di musica (2010)
Dietro un grande amore (2015)
La mia vita è un film (2021)

Filmography

References

External links

 

 
 

1943 births
People from the Province of Reggio Emilia
Italian pop singers
Living people
Italian folk singers
Italian television personalities
Folk-pop singers

Italian women singers
Italian actresses
Italian women singer-songwriters